Little Thatch is a privately owned island of the British Virgin Islands in the Caribbean, upon which a resort has been built. The island was sold by John and Jill Maynard in December 2014 to the owners of OtterBox, Curt and Nancy Richardson.

It is believed to take its name from the famous pirate, Edward Teach (better known as "Blackbeard"), although there is little evidence Blackbeard ever sailed in the Virgin Islands.

The island provides habitat for the big-scaled least gecko (Sphaerodactylus macrolepis macrolepis).

References

Private islands of the British Virgin Islands